WVKS (92.5 FM) also known as 92.5 KISS-FM is an iHeartMedia-owned station serving Toledo, Ohio with a Top 40 (CHR) format; it is the most popular Toledo station in this format.

WVKS' studios and offices are located at Superior and Lafayette in downtown Toledo. The station's transmitter is located on Neiderhouse Road in Perrysburg Township, Ohio.

Inception and early usage
92.5 went on the air in the Toledo area as WMHE on October 14, 1957. The station was founded by William A. Hillebrand (1917–2005). Though FM broadcasting was still in its infancy at the time, Hillebrand saw FM radio, with its superior sound quality for musical recordings, as an investment that would prove viable in the long run. "He foresaw something that he thought was going to be successful and he was right," his widow, Marvel Hillebrand, told The Toledo Blade after his death in 2005. The call letters stood for "Wired Music Hillebrand Electronics".

WMHE's initial format consisted of "fine arts" music programming, including classical, jazz, and big band music. But, another important reason why Mr. Hillebrand created WMHE was to transmit the new Muzak subscription service to businesses and restaurants in the Toledo area. FM radio has a second audio channel, a subcarrier channel, that's only received through special receivers and used to distribute Muzak. The transmitter was located behind the studio building on Bancroft St. next to an electronics store also owned and operated by Mr. Hillebrand (Hillebrand Electronics).

In the early 1970s, Mr. Hillebrand wanted to expand his Muzak coverage area and constructed a much larger transmitter at a new site near Perrysburg, Ohio. The tower was 550 feet tall and the transmitter generated 50,000 watts of Muzak power. With his new transmitter, Mr. Hillebrand could now offer Muzak to places as far away as Lima, Ohio and Fort Wayne, Indiana. The programming on the regular FM channel remained beautiful music.

But, in 1975, Mr. Hillebrand decided to capitalize on the popularity of rock and roll so a new staff was hired to launch the new station. It consisted of Dave Deppish (mornings), Mark Howell (middays), Mike O'Mara (evenings), and Larry Weseman (nights). In the spring of 1975, Toledo's newest album oriented rock (AOR) station debuted with The Doobie Brothers "Listen to the Music". Within a year, more jocks were hired including Timm Morrison (later of WWWM-FM and WMJC in Detroit) and Bob Crowley.

WMHE, with its unique blend of rock and roll, became a very popular Toledo station garnishing the highest Toledo ratings during middays, and because of the large coverage area, it became very popular throughout a good portion of Ohio, Michigan, and Indiana. The station gained in popularity when many of the stores that carried Muzak, would switch over to the main audio channel in order to pull in WMHE. Its primary competition was WIOT, and some of the WIOT jocks joined the WMHE airstaff over the next few years. They included Dorien Pastor (founder of WIOT), John Fisher as the new morning man and program director (now at KHTP-Seattle), and Bob Thomas. Toledo jock Buddy Carr was also part of the airstaff in 1976.  Rick Bird was news director for a time with other news personalities Tom Waniewski and Chris O'Connor both from the University of Toledo.

Because of Mr. Hillebrand's fascination with new radio technology, WMHE was partially automated. The automation consisted of a bank of six cartridge "carousels" each holding 24 tape cartridges. All of the music was on these cartridges or "carts" (similar to 8-track tapes), but only one item (a song, a voicetrack, or a commercial) was on each cart. The jocks would record their announcements on individual carts, usually introducing a song or back-announcing a few songs that had just played in the carousel. Portions of the morning and evening shows were performed 'live'.

WMHE operated in this fashion (promoting itself "turn MHE [me] on") through 1978 at which time the format was briefly changed to disco. Following much anger from its listeners (and major damage to the station's sign out front) disco was dumped and the format was changed back to rock. By 1981, the station changed to an equally successful Adult contemporary format. In the early 1980s, WMHE was named one of the 500 most-listened-to stations in the country.

Hillebrand finally sold WMHE to Osborn Communications in 1986, and then to Noble Broadcasting in 1988. In the face of the changes, WMHE switched to Top 40/CHR. To compete better with then rival WRQN, 93Q, the station dropped the call letters WMHE in favor of WVKS and moved to an Adult Top 40 presentation.  Their slogan was "The Right Music, Right Now." The new "92.5 KISS FM" became a ratings powerhouse in Toledo (especially after WRQN left the CHR format to flip to Oldies in October 1991), consistently racking up 12+ shares in the double digits and challenging the market's longtime ratings leaders, country-formatted WKKO (K100) and rocker (and future sister station) WIOT. The ratings boom came largely as a result of station manager Andy Stewart's decision to hire DJ's Denny Schaffer (mornings), Johny D (Afternoon Drive) and Billy Michaels (nights).

In the mid-'90s the station was sold to Jacor Communications, and its dominance continued.  WVKS left its original studio on Bancroft Street and moved downtown to the Superior Street studios of sister stations WRVF and WSPD in 1998 when iHeartMedia (then Clear Channel Communications) took over operations.  Shortly thereafter 92.5 KISS FM lost its individual identity and became part of Clear Channel's standard issue KISS format.  In the late 1990s and early 2000s the station got more competition in the form of urban stations WJUC and WJZE in (March 2005) as well as another CHR station, Cumulus Media's WTWR-FM (Tower 98-3), which moved from Monroe, Michigan to achieve better coverage of the market; WTWR has since switched to adult contemporary music and re-focused on Monroe as "My 98-3" WMIM, leading WVKS to once again have the CHR format all to itself in Toledo.  While no longer the ratings giant it was in the 1990s, 92.5 KISS FM remains among Toledo's top five most listened-to stations among all (12+) listeners.

HD Radio
On September 15, 2014, WVKS-HD2 began simulcasting on 94.9 W235BH, a former simulcast of WSPD. After a one-day stunt of Christmas music, it began to broadcast urban contemporary music as "94.9, The Beat". Previous to this, WVKS-HD2 aired a canned EDM format provided by iHeartRadio.

References

External links 
92.5 KISS-FM
WVKS FM 92.5 at Michiguide

VKS
Contemporary hit radio stations in the United States
Radio stations established in 1957
IHeartMedia radio stations